Amygdalaria is a genus of lichen-forming fungi in the family Lecideaceae.

Species
Amygdalaria aeolotera 
Amygdalaria consentiens 
Amygdalaria continua 
Amygdalaria elegantior 
Amygdalaria haidensis 
Amygdalaria panaeola 
Amygdalaria pelobotryon 
Amygdalaria subdissentiens 
Amygdalaria verrucosa

References

Lecideales
Lecideales genera
Lichen genera
Taxa described in 1852